Events from the year 1966 in Taiwan, Republic of China. This year is numbered Minguo 55 according to the official Republic of China calendar.

Incumbents
 President – Chiang Kai-shek
 Vice President – Yen Chia-kan
 Premier – Yen Chia-kan
 Vice Premier – Yu Ching-tang, Huang Shao-ku

Events

January
 7 January – The establishment of Chun Yuan Steel.
 28 January – The establishment of National Youth Commission.

February
 15 February – President of South Korea Park Chung-hee visited Taiwan.

March
 13 March – The 8.0  Hualien earthquake occurred off the Hualien County coast.
 22 March – The completion of Jhaishan Tunnel in Kinmen County.

July
 17 July – The completion of Touliao Guesthouse construction in Daxi Township, Taoyuan County.

September
 1 September – The appointment of Sun Fo as the President of Examination Yuan.

December
 30 December – Taipei was approved by Executive Yuan to become a special municipality.

Births
 5 January – Hsu Chih-chieh, member of 8th Legislative Yuan
 15 May – Hsu Yung-ming, member of Legislative Yuan
 22 June – Doze Niu, actor, film director, show host, screenwriter and producer
 31 August – Stella Chang, singer
 6 December – Yang Yao, member of Legislative Yuan
 12 December – Li Meng-yen, Secretary-General of Executive Yuan

References

 
Years of the 20th century in Taiwan